Sebastián "Titan" Silva Cerda (born 12 March 1996) is a Chilean professional basketball player for Club Deportivo Universidad Católica of the Liga Nacional de Básquetbol de Chile.
Sebastián Silva is originally from Linares, Chile.

National team
Silva played for Chile's national basketball team, both at junior and senior level. At the 2018 South American Games, where Chile competed with its under-25 team, Silva was part of the starting lineup in all games. He helped secure the bronze medal.

References

External links
Profile at RealGM.com
Profile at 2021 FIBA Americup Qualifiers
Profile at Eurobasket.com

1996 births
Living people
Power forwards (basketball)
Chilean men's basketball players
South American Games medalists in basketball
South American Games bronze medalists for Chile
Chile men's national basketball team players
21st-century Chilean people